Sahjanwa railway station is located in the town of Sahjanwa district of Gorakhpur in the Indian state of Uttar Pradesh. it was constructed in 1980.

The station offers class B railway station facilities.

Some major railway stations located near sahjanwa are, Basti, and Gorakhpur. It is directly and well connected by Gorakhpur, Varanasi, Lucknow, Gonda, Basti, Kanpur, Jhansi, Durg, Agra, Barauni, New Delhi, Bhopal, Mumbai, Nasik, Allahabad, and Ayodhya. After developing as a satellite station it will be become major terminating junction for Lucknow–Bahraich–Gonda–Varanasi and south side of Gorakhpur via Dohrighat.

History
The railway line between Gorakhpur–Gonda loop, running between Gorakhpur and Gonda, was constructed by North Eastern Railway between 1979 and 1995–2000.

Trains which have stop at Sahjanwa railway station 
There are currently 10 trains that take a halt at this station. They are-

See also

References

External links 
https://indiarailinfo.com/search/gkp-gorakhpur-junction-to-swa-sahjanwa/539/0/916

Railway stations in Gorakhpur district